This is a round-up of the 1966 Sligo Senior Football Championship. Easkey, one of the traditional strongholds of Sligo football, claimed their fifth title, after a gap of 25 years, when overpowering the challenge of Ballymote in the final. The final had two 'lasts' to its outcome - Easkey's last title and Ballymote's last final appearance to date.

First round

Quarter-finals

Semi-finals

Sligo Senior Football Championship Final

References

 Sligo Champion (Summer-Autumn 1966)

Sligo Senior Football Championship
Sligo